David Lorge Parnas (born February 10, 1941) is a Canadian early pioneer of software engineering, who developed the concept of information hiding in modular programming, which is an important element of object-oriented programming today.  He is also noted for his advocacy of precise documentation.

Life
Parnas earned his PhD at Carnegie Mellon University in electrical engineering. Parnas also earned a professional engineering license in Canada and was one of the first to apply traditional engineering principles to software design.
He worked there as a professor for many years.  He also taught at the University of North Carolina at Chapel Hill (U.S.), at the Department of Computer Science of the Technische Universität Darmstadt (Germany), the University of Victoria (British Columbia, Canada), Queen's University in Kingston, Ontario, McMaster University in Hamilton, Ontario, and University of Limerick (Republic of Ireland).

David Parnas received a number of awards and honors:

 ACM "Best Paper" Award, 1979
 Norbert Wiener Award for Social and Professional Responsibility, 1987
 Two "Most Influential Paper" awards International Conference on Software Engineering, 1991 and 1995
 Doctor honoris causa of the Computer Science Department, ETH Zurich, Switzerland, 1986
 Fellow of the Royal Society of Canada, 1992
 Fellow of the Association for Computing Machinery, 1994
 Doctor honoris causa of the Louvain School of Engineering, University of Louvain (UCLouvain), Belgium, 1996
 ACM SIGSOFT's "Outstanding Research" award, 1998
 IEEE Computer Society's 60th Anniversary Award, 2007
 Doctor honoris causa of the Faculty of Informatics, University of Lugano, Switzerland, 2008
 Fellow of the Gesellschaft für Informatik, 2008
 Fellow of the Institute of Electrical and Electronics Engineers (IEEE), 2009
 Doctor honoris causa of the Vienna University of Technology (Dr. Tech.H.C.), Vienna Austria, 2011

Work

Modular design
In modular design, his double dictum of high cohesion within modules and loose coupling between modules is fundamental to modular design in software.  However, in Parnas's seminal 1972 paper On the Criteria to Be Used in Decomposing Systems into Modules, this dictum is expressed in terms of information hiding, and the terms cohesion and coupling are not used. He never used them.

Technical activism
Dr Parnas took a public stand against the US Strategic Defense Initiative (also known as "Star Wars") in the mid 1980s, arguing that it would be impossible to write an application of sufficient quality that it could be trusted to prevent a nuclear attack.  He has also been in the forefront of those urging the professionalization of "software engineering" (a term that he characterizes as "an unconsummated marriage"). Dr. Parnas is also a heavy promoter of ethics in the field of software engineering.

Stance on academic evaluation methods
Parnas has joined the group of scientists which openly criticize the number-of-publications-based approach towards ranking academic production. On his November 2007 paper Stop the Numbers Game, he elaborates on several reasons on why the current number-based academic evaluation system used in many fields by universities all over the world (be it either oriented to the amount of publications or the amount of quotations each of those get) is flawed and, instead of contributing to scientific progress, it leads to knowledge stagnation.

Bibliography

See also
Automatic programming

References

Further reading

External links
McMaster University (Hamilton, Ontario, Canada)
University of Limerick profile broken 2013-4-26 and CV broken 2013-4-26
 IEEE Computer Society's 60th Anniversary Award

1941 births
Living people
People from Plattsburgh, New York
American computer scientists
Carnegie Mellon University College of Engineering alumni
Carnegie Mellon University faculty
Formal methods people
Fellows of the Association for Computing Machinery
Academic staff of McMaster University
Canadian software engineers
Software engineering researchers
Academics of the University of Limerick
Scientists from New York (state)
Academic staff of Technische Universität Darmstadt